Highway hypnosis, also known as white line fever, is an altered mental state in which a person can drive a car, truck, or other automobile great distances, responding to external events in the expected, safe, and correct manner with no recollection of having consciously done so. In this state, the driver's conscious mind is apparently fully focused elsewhere, while seemingly still processing the information needed to drive safely. Highway hypnosis is a manifestation of the common process of automaticity.

The concept was first described in a 1921 article that mentioned the phenomenon of "road hypnotism": driving in a trance-like state while gazing at a fixed point. A 1929 study, Sleeping with the Eyes Open by Walter Miles, also dealt with the subject, suggesting that it was possible for motorists to fall asleep with their eyes open and continuing to steer. The idea that the unaccountable automobile accidents could be explained by this phenomenon became popular in the 1950s. The term "highway hypnosis" was coined by G. W. Williams in 1963. Building on the theories of Ernest Hilgard (1986, 1992) that hypnosis is an altered state of awareness, some theorists hold that the consciousness can develop hypnotic dissociation. In the example of highway hypnosis, one stream of consciousness is driving the car while the other is dealing with other matters.  Partial or complete amnesia related to the time spent driving under highway hypnosis can develop for the driver involved.

See also
Automaticity
Automatism (law)
Muscle memory
Microsleep
Selective hearing
Sleep-deprived driving

References

Driving
Hypnosis